Robert E. Higgins (March 25, 1925 – September 4, 1998) was an American weightlifter, who competed in the featherweight class and represented United States at international competitions. He won the gold medal at the 1947 World Weightlifting Championships in the 60 kg category. He was from Indianapolis, Indiana and owned and managed a gym there. He died in 1998 at the age of 73.

References

1925 births
1998 deaths
American male weightlifters
World Weightlifting Championships medalists
20th-century American people